Len Walsh (24 July 1912 – 28 April 1993) was an  Australian rules footballer who played with Hawthorn in the Victorian Football League (VFL).

Notes

External links 

1912 births
1993 deaths
Australian rules footballers from Victoria (Australia)
Hawthorn Football Club players